Edmund Carlton Horton (March 25, 1896 – May 26, 1944) was an American bobsledder who competed in the early 1930s. He won the silver medal in the four-man event at the 1932 Winter Olympics in Lake Placid.

References
Bobsleigh four-man Olympic medalists for 1924, 1932-56, and since 1964
DatabaseOlympics.com profile

1896 births
1944 deaths
American male bobsledders
Bobsledders at the 1932 Winter Olympics
Olympic silver medalists for the United States in bobsleigh
People from New York (state)
Medalists at the 1932 Winter Olympics